Diyarbakir Province may refer to:

 Diyarbakır Province, a province of modern Turkey (1922–present)
 Diyarbekir Vilayet, a vilayet of the Ottoman Empire (1867–1922)
 Diyarbekir Eyalet, an eyalet of the Ottoman Empire (1515–1867)

Province name disambiguation pages